The American League Against War and Fascism was an organization formed in 1933 by the Communist Party USA and pacifists united by their concern as Nazism and Fascism rose in Europe. In 1937 the name of the group was changed to the American League for Peace and Democracy.  Rev. Dr. Harry F. Ward headed the organization.

Organizational history

Formation
The American League Against War and Fascism, though it attempted to attract as broad a following as possible and included members of the Roosevelt administration, was based primarily in the working class and its leadership was largely socialist and communist. By 1937, its Communist Party members boasted that 30 percent of the entire organized labor movement was represented in the League, and labor delegates occupied 413 of the 1416 seats at the national convention. African-Americans were also well represented in both the leadership and rank-and-file delegates.

1937 name change
In 1937 the organization changed its name to the American League for Peace and Democracy. Helen Silvermaster was associated with this group.

Dissolution
The League dissolved after the 1939 signing of the Molotov–Ribbentrop Pact, a non-aggression treaty between Josef Stalin's Soviet Union and Adolf Hitler's Nazi Germany that ended the CPUSA's anti-Hitler activity until the 1941 Nazi invasion of the USSR,  discouraged its non-communist members. Its communist elements then influenced the founding of the American Peace Mobilization front to lobby against American help for the Allies, particular the United Kingdom under Prime Minister Winston Churchill,  in their struggle against Hitler in the opening years of World War II.

Members

Leaders included Rev. Harry F. Ward.

Members included Elizabeth Bentley (later Soviet spy, later FBI informant).

Publications
The League produced a monthly broadsheet entitled FIGHT Against War and Fascism, published in New York City under the editorship of Liston M. Oak.

See also
 List of anti-war organizations

Footnotes

External links
Communists Discover the Churches
Proceedings: fourth national congress, People's congress for democracy and peace, Pittsburgh, Nov. 26–28, 1937

1933 establishments in the United States
Communist Party USA mass organizations
Peace organizations based in the United States
Organizations established in 1933